Sóllilja Bjarnadóttir (born 13 February 1995) is an Icelandic basketball player who plays for Breiðablik in the Icelandic top-tier Úrvalsdeild kvenna. Outside of Breiðablik, she has played with Stjarnan, Valur and KR in Iceland. She played professionally for A3 Basket Umeå in the Basketligan dam during the 2021–2022 season.

On 24 February 2021, Sóllilja scored 28 points, including 17 points in a row, in a victory against KR.

National team career
Sóllilja played 6 games for the Iceland national team from 2016 to 2019.

References

External links
Icelandic statistics at Icelandic Basketball Association

1995 births
Living people
Sollilja Bjarnadottir
Guards (basketball)
Sollilja Bjarnadottir
Sollilja Bjarnadottir
Sollilja Bjarnadottir
Sollilja Bjarnadottir
Sollilja Bjarnadottir
Sollilja Bjarnadottir